Operation Mitra (Italian: Operazione Mitra) is a 1951 Italian thriller film directed by Giorgio Cristallini and starring Steve Barclay and Marina Berti.

Cast
 Steve Barclay 
 Marina Berti
 Margherita Bagni 
 Silvio Bagolini 
 Vickie Henderson 
 Piero Lulli 
 Carlo Ninchi 
 Franco Pesce 
 Paola Quattrini 
 Roberto Risso 
 Giovanna Scotto 
 Liliana Tellini 
 Marco Vicario

References

Bibliography
 Emiliano Morreale. Così piangevano: il cinema melò nell'Italia degli anni Cinquanta. Donzelli Editore, 2011.

External links
 

1951 films
1950s Italian-language films
Italian thriller films
1950s thriller films
Films directed by Giorgio Cristallini
Films scored by Mario Nascimbene
Italian black-and-white films
1950s Italian films